William Derbyshire (died 16 January 1974) was an English professional rugby league footballer who played in the 1940s and 1950s.

Playing career

International honours
Billy Derbyshire won a cap for England while at Warrington in 1947 against Wales.

Championship final appearances
Billy Derbyshire played left-, i.e. number 8, in Warrington's 15-5 victory over Bradford Northern in the Championship Final during the 1947–48 season at Maine Road, Manchester.

Challenge Final appearances
Billy Derbyshire played left-, i.e. number 8, in Warrington's 19-0 victory over Widnes in the 1949–50 Challenge Cup Final during the 1949–50 season at Wembley Stadium, London on Saturday 6 May 1950, in front of a crowd of 94,249

County Cup Final appearances
Billy Derbyshire played left-, i.e. number 8, in Warrington's 8-14 defeat by Wigan in the 1948–49 Lancashire County Cup Final during the 1948–49 season at Station Road, Swinton on Saturday 13 November 1948, and played left-, i.e. number 8, in the 5-28 defeat by Wigan in the 1950–51 Lancashire County Cup Final during the 1949–50 season at Station Road, Swinton on Saturday 4 November 1950.

Club career
Billy Derbyshire transferred from Liverpool Stanley to Warrington (alongside Bill Riley) prior to the 1947–48 season, he made his début for Warrington on Saturday 30 August 1947, and he played his last match for Warrington on Wednesday 29 August 1951.

References

External links

 (archived by web.archive.org) Statistics at wolvesplayers.thisiswarrington.co.uk (martini)

1974 deaths
England national rugby league team players
English rugby league players
Liverpool City (rugby league) players
Place of birth missing
Place of death missing
Rugby league props
Warrington Wolves players
Year of birth missing